ILF may refer to:

 Ilford Airport, the IATA code for the airport in Canada
 Indiana Library Federation, professional association for librarians
 Industry Liaison Forum of the International AIDS Society
 Inferior longitudinal fasciculus, a nerve bundle in the brain
 Innocent Lives Foundation, an organization dedicated to unmasking anonymous online child predators to help bring them to justice.
 International Lacrosse Federation
 International Landworkers' Federation, a former global union federation
 Interactive Life Forms, the parent company of Fleshlight brand products.
 International Lifeboat Federation now the International Maritime Rescue Federation
 Ilya Ilf, a Russian writer.
 Interactive Literature Foundation, the predecessor to the Live Action Roleplayers Association
 Institute for Law and Finance, graduate law school of the Johann Wolfgang Goethe University Frankfurt am Main, Germany
 International Literacy Foundation, an international charity founded in 2010 with the aim of tackling illiteracy
 Institut Lean France, non-profit organization that aim to promote lean thinking, member of the LGN (Lean Global Network)
 International Limb Fittings, a recurve bow limb attachment system.
 Islamabad Literature Festival, an annual international literary festival held in Islamabad, Pakistan